In the Land of Hi-Fi with Julian Cannonball Adderley is the fourth album by jazz saxophonist Cannonball Adderley, and his third released on the EmArcy label, featuring a nonet (six horns, three rhythm) with Nat Adderley, Jerome Richardson, Ernie Royal, Bobby Byrne, Jimmy Cleveland, Danny Bank, Junior Mance, Keter Betts, and Charles "Specs" Wright.

Reception
The Allmusic review awarded the album 2½ stars.

Track listing
 "Dog My Cats" (Ernie Wilkins) - 2:26
 "I'm Glad There Is You" (Jimmy Dorsey, Paul Mertz) - 2:36
 "Blues for Bohemia" (Julian Cannonball Adderley, Nat Adderley) - 3:56
 "Junior's Tune" (Junior Mance) - 3:24
 "Between the Devil and the Deep Blue Sea" (Harold Arlen, Ted Koehler) - 3:23
 "Casa de Marcel" (Marcel Daniels) - 2:43
 "Little Girl Blue" (Richard Rodgers, Lorenz Hart) - 2:37
 "T's Tune" (Tommy Turrentine) - 3:13
 "Broadway at Basin Street" (Al Frisch, Sid Wayne) - 3:43
 "Just Norman" (Charles "Specs" Wright) - 2:31
 "I Don't Care" (Ray Bryant) - 2:38
Recorded at Capitol Studios in New York City on June 8 (tracks 5, 7, 9 & 10) and June 18 (tracks 1-4, 6, 8 & 11), 1956.

Personnel
Cannonball Adderley - alto saxophone
Jerome Richardson - tenor saxophone, flute
Danny Bank - baritone saxophone
Nat Adderley – cornet
Ernie Royal - trumpet
Bobby Byrne, Jimmy Cleveland - trombone
Junior Mance - piano
Keter Betts - bass
Charles "Specs" Wright - drums
Ernie Wilkins - conductor, arranger

References

1956 albums
EmArcy Records albums
Cannonball Adderley albums
Albums arranged by Ernie Wilkins
Albums conducted by Ernie Wilkins